The Transversal programme is part of the European Commission's Lifelong Learning Programme 2007–2013. 

It complements the main sub-programmes of the Lifelong Learning Programme 2007–2013 in order to ensure that they achieve the best results. 
The programme is focused on policy co-operation, languages, information and communication technologies, effective dissemination and exploitation of project results.

References

External links 
European Union — The Lifelong Learning Programme 2007–2013
UK - The Lifelong Learning Programme 2007-2013
UK - Transversal programme

Educational policies and initiatives of the European Union
Information technology organizations based in Europe